Clark Township is one of nineteen current townships in Pope County, Arkansas, USA. As of the 2010 census, its unincorporated population was 3,386. The Arkansas Nuclear One power plant is located here near the city of London, just outside Russellville.

Geography
Clark Township gave part of its area to Bayliss Township in 1876.

Cities, towns, and villages
London

References
 United States Census Bureau 2008 TIGER/Line Shapefiles
 United States Board on Geographic Names (GNIS)
 United States National Atlas

External links
 US-Counties.com
 City-Data.com

Townships in Pope County, Arkansas
Townships in Arkansas